Hussain Sha (September 9, 1905 – September 24, 1981) was the seventh head of Sri Viswa Viznana Vidya Adhyatmika Peetham in Pithapuram. He was born in Rajahmundry, East Godavari District. He succeeded his father, Kavisekhara Dr Umar Alisha Sathguru. He completed his primary education at Pithapuram and passed the Final Arts course from National College in Machilipatnam. He was a scholar in Telugu, Arabic, Urdu, Persian and Sanskrit.

Sha and his wife Ajeemunnisa Begum had four sons and four daughters. Prior to assuming the charge as Peethadhipathi (Head of the Institution), his main occupation was farming. Drawing on that knowledge, he made a celestial herbal medicine Devadaru.

Hussain Sha had taken up preaching of the Peetham's philosophy from February 10, 1945. He delivered Divine spiritual messages at many villages and cities of Andhra Pradesh to propagate Jnanayoga (Yoga of Supreme Knowledge) and Bhaktiyoga (Yoga of Devotion). He died in Pithapuram, East Godavari District, Andhra Pradesh, India.

Hussain Sha is also known for his philosophy. In SHA TATWAM, he has explained many things about the Miraculous Brilliant Divine Light and how the man should behave.

Bibliography
Sha Tatvam (Telugu language, "Philosophy") 
Sha Philosophy Part 1(English translation of Sha Tatvam)

1905 births
1981 deaths
Indian spiritual writers
Theosophy
Spiritual teachers
20th-century Hindu philosophers and theologians
Indian Sufis
People from East Godavari district
Telugu writers
Writers from Andhra Pradesh